Čeferin is a surname. Notable people with the surname include:

Aleksander Čeferin (born 1967), Slovenian lawyer and football administrator
Darko Čeferin (born 1968), Slovenian football referee 
Peter Čeferin (born 1938), Slovenian attorney and author

Slovene-language surnames